{{DISPLAYTITLE:C17H24N2O}}
The molecular formula C17H24N2O (molar mass: 272.38 g/mol) may refer to:

 Bucinnazine
 Pilsicainide
 Quinisocaine, also called dimethisoquin

Molecular formulas